Peter Carr (1884 – 18 October 1946) was a New Zealand politician of the Labour Party.

Private life

Carr was born in Papakura in 1884, the son of R. and A Carr. He was educated locally at the Papakura and Drury schools. In his youth, he played cricket and football. A quiet spoken man, he was to live in Auckland his whole life. He later entered the union movement as a career and became president of the Auckland Tramways Union, serving in the post for twelve years (1928–1940). Carr served in the New Zealand Expeditionary Force during World War I as a motorman, holding the rank of Lance Corporal.

In 1916, he married Margaret Duckworth, the daughter of A. Duckworth. In 1941, they lived in Kelmarna Avenue in Herne Bay.

Political career

Carr was a founding member of the Labour Party, joining on its inception in 1916. He entered the political arena via local body politics and was elected as an Auckland City Councillor in 1935 and 1938. He served as the City Council's representative on the committee of the Leys Institute and was also a member of the council's works committee.

He represented the Auckland West electorate from a  after the previous holder, Labour prime minister Michael Joseph Savage, died in office.

Carr fell ill during the 1946 session but remained in Parliament for his vote to be counted. On 5 October, shortly before the end of that year's session, he announced his intention to retire at the upcoming general election. He died a fortnight later, on 18 October, a month before the general election.

Notes

References

External links
Photo of Carr from the Otago Daily Times

1884 births
1946 deaths
New Zealand Labour Party MPs
Members of the New Zealand House of Representatives
New Zealand MPs for Auckland electorates
Auckland City Councillors
New Zealand military personnel of World War I